Särkijärvi is a medium-sized lake in the Vuoksi main catchment area. It is located in the North Karelia region in Finland, close to border with Russia. There are 178 lakes with this name in Finland. This lake is the biggest of them.

See also
List of lakes in Finland

References

Lakes of Tohmajärvi